Rawal Lake  in Pakistan is an artificial reservoir that provides the water needs for the cities of Rawalpindi and Islamabad. Korang River along with some other small streams coming from Margalla Hills have been set to form this artificial lake which covers an area of 8.8 km². Korang River is the outlet stream of Rawal Dam. Rawal Lake is located within an isolated section of the Village Malpur, Bani Gala and Margalla Hills National Park.

Recreation
The area around the lake has been planted with flowering trees and laid out with gardens, picnic spots, and secluded paths.  
The terraced garden and the lake are used for picnics, fishing and boating. The highest point in the garden offers a panoramic view of the lake, Margalla and Murree hills, Rawalpindi and Islamabad.

Boating, sailing, water skating and diving facilities are organized by private clubs.

To the west of the lake is the Islamabad Club, which offers different sporting facilities.

Wildlife
The reservoir is of considerable importance for wintering waterfowl, especially Anas platyrhynchos.

Resident mammals include the Red fox, Indian pangolin, Indian crested porcupine, jungle cat, Persian jackal, Central Asian boar and yellow-throated marten.

Reptiles include Indian Cobra and Russell's Viper.

It is a good place for birds watching, as the majority of Birds of Islamabad are found here.

Fishery
There are 15 fish species belonging to 11 genera that are present in Rawal Lake. The fish species in Rawal lake and its tributaries include: Doula (Channa channa), Rahu
(Labeorohita), Thaila (Catla catla), Mori (Cirrhinus mrigala), Carp fish (Cyprinus carpio) and Talapia (Tilapia mossambica).

Features of Rawal Lake

Location: Islamabad Park Area 
Longitude: 73° 7' E
Latitude: 33° 41' N
Catchments Area: 106.25 square miles (275 km²)

Features of Rawal Lake dam
Type of dam: partly arched gravity dam (stone masonry)
Crest level: 
Crest length: 
Maximum height:

Saddle
Length 
Height

Spillway
Type: Ogee gated structure
Discharge Capacity: 82000 ft³/s (2,300 m³/s)

Reservoir
Area: 
Maximum depth: 
Live storage: 
Dead storage: 
Gross capacity:

Canals
Left bank canal(Shahana Disty): length 
Capacity: 40 ft³/s (1.1 m³/s)
 Purpose: Irrigation
Right bank canal (Ojri Disty) : length 
Capacity: 70 ft³/s (2.0 m³/s)
 Purpose: Drinking water supply to Rawalpindi

Drinking water supply
Rawalpindi:

Command area
Agriculture:

See also
Birds of Islamabad
Rawal Lake View Park
Simly Dam

Notes

References
Small Dams Organization(Govt. Of The Punjab, Irrigation Department,  Development Zone, Lahore, Small Dams Organization, Islamabad)

Lakes of Islamabad
Dams in Pakistan
Tourist attractions in Islamabad